Kisko block is a CD block that forms an administrative division in the Lohardaga subdivision of Lohardaga district, in the Indian state of Jharkhand.

History 
Lohardaga was made a subdivision of Ranchi district in 1972. Ranchi district was split into three districts namely Ranchi, Gumla and Lohardaga, in 1983.

Maoist activities 
Lohardaga has been identified as an “A” grade highly Maoist infested district. Kuru, Bhandra, Kairo, Kisko, Jowang and Senha police stations are totally affected and Lohardaga police station is partially affected. The Maoist outfits are mainly interested in extorting the bauxite mining and transport industry. The police force has been trained to take on the Maoist outfits and has been extending support at important points. Lohardaga has lost one Superintendent of Police, Ajay Kumar Singh, IPS in the anti-insurgency operations.

Geography 

Lohardaga district consists of two broad physiographic divisions – the hilly tract and the plateau region. The hilly tract extends over the western and north-western parts of the district. The high hill tops of this region are known as pat. The plateau region is a part of the Gumla Plateau, which lies in the southern portion of Chota Nagpur Plateau. Lohardaga and Bhandra CD blocks are entirely in the plateau region. Other administrative areas, such as Kisko, Senha and Kuru CD blocks are partly in the plateau region and partly in the hilly tract.

Kisko CD block is bounded by the Latehar CD block in Latehar district on the north, Kuru and Lohardaga CD blocks on the east, Senha CD block on the south and Peshrar CD block on the west.

Kisko CD block has an area of 253.29 km2. Kisko police station serves Kisko CD block. The headquarters of Kisko CD block is located at Kisko village.

Demographics

Population 
According to the 2011 Census of India, Kisko CD block had a total population of 54,959, all of which were rural. There were 27,692 (50%) males and 27,267 (50%) females. Population in the age range 0–6 years was 9,373. Scheduled Castes numbered 1,663 (3.03%) and Scheduled Tribes numbered 33,559 (61.06%).

Literacy 
According to  the 2011 census, the total number of literate persons in Kisko CD block was 29,422 (64.54% of the population over 6 years) out of which males numbered 17,212 (74.89% of the male population over 6 years) and females numbered 12,210 (54.02% of the female population over 6 years). The gender disparity (the difference between female and male literacy rates) was 20.87%.

 census, literacy in Lohardaga district was 78.62%. Literacy in Jharkhand was 67.63% in 2011. Literacy in India in 2011 was 74.04%.

See also – List of Jharkhand districts ranked by literacy rate

Language and religion 

At the time of the 2011 census, 36.35% of the population spoke Kurukh, 32.83% Sadri, 20.01% Urdu, 7.08% Hindi and 3.43% Mundari as their first language.

Rural poverty 
70-80% of the population of Lohardaga district were in the BPL category in 2004–2005. In 2011-12, the proportion of BPL population in  Lohardaga district came down to 38.0%. According to a study in 2013 (modified in 2019), "the incidence of poverty in Jharkhand is estimated at 46%, but 60% of the scheduled castes and scheduled tribes are still below poverty line."

Economy

Livelihood 

In Kisko CD block in 2011, amongst the class of total workers, cultivators numbered 12,209 and formed 42.13%, agricultural labourers numbered 13,288 and formed 45.85%, household industry workers numbered 652 and formed 2.25% and other workers numbered 2,832 and formed 9.77%. Total workers numbered 28,981 and formed 52.73% of the total population, and non-workers numbered 25,978 and formed 47.27% of the population.

Infrastructure 
There are 52 inhabited villages in Kisko CD block. In 2011, 10 villages had power supply. 5 villages had tap water (treated/ untreated), 52 villages had well water (covered/ uncovered), 48 villages had hand pumps, and all villages have drinking water facility. 9 villages had post offices, 10 villages had sub post offices, 5 villages had telephones (land lines), 13 villages had mobile phone coverage. 52 villages had pucca (paved) village roads, 6 villages had bus service (public/ private), 13 villages had autos/ modified autos, 7 villages had taxi/vans, 18 villages had tractors. 7 villages had bank branches, 5 villages had agricultural credit societies, 21 villages had public distribution system, 32 villages had assembly polling stations.

Agriculture 
Large areas of the district were earlier covered with forests. With gradual deforestation, more land is being brought under cultivation. At present around 32-35% of the total area is covered with forests. Rice is grown in the terraced lowlands called don. In the uplands called tanr, a coarse form of rice, millets, pulses and oil seeds are grown.  Agriculture is mostly monsoon-dependent. “The wells, springs and ahars are the only traditional sources of irrigation. The average land holding per household is 1.65 Ha. The per capita agriculture land is around 0.28 Ha. Net irrigated area is 13.4% of net sown area”.

Bauxite 
Bauxite is the raw material from which aluminium is produced. Lohardaga district has large reserves of world class bauxite across Pakhar, Hisari, Rudhali Pat, Khamar Pat and the mining area also extends to neighbouring districts.  The district has approval of mining of approximately 11 lakh tones of bauxite mineral in a year.  Hindalco Industries Ltd has 7 mining leases out of 9 active mines in Lohardaga district which supplies bauxite to Hindalco’s aluminium plants at Muri and Renukoot. A ropeway connecting Bagru mines and Lohardaga has been a popular tourist attraction.

Backward Regions Grant Fund 
Lohardaga district is listed as a backward region and receives financial support from the Backward Regions Grant Fund. The fund, created by the Government of India, is designed to redress regional imbalances in development. As of 2012, 272 districts across the country were listed under this scheme. The list includes 21 districts of Jharkhand.

Education 
Kisko CD block had 18 villages with pre-primary schools, 47 villages with primary schools, 24 villages with middle schools, 5 villages with secondary schools, 2 villages with senior secondary schools, 4 villages with no educational facilities. 
.*Senior secondary schools are also known as Inter colleges in Jharkhand

Healthcare 
Kisko CD block had 2 villages with primary health centres, 9 villages with primary health subcentres, 3 villages with maternity and child welfare centres, 5 villages with allopathic hospitals, 3 villages with dispensaries, 2 villages with veterinary hospitals, 3 villages with family welfare centres, 1 village with medicine shop. 
.*Private medical practitioners, alternative medicine etc. not included

References

Community development blocks in Lohardaga district